William Bruce Knight (1786–1845) was Dean of Llandaff from 1843 until his death.

Life
Bruce Knight was born in Braunton, Devon, to John Knight and his wife Mary Bruce; when he was young the family moved to Llanblethian in the Vale of Glamorgan. He was educated at Cowbridge Grammar School and Sherborne. He studied at Exeter College, Oxford. He held incumbencies at Llantrithyd and Margam; and was a Prebendary of Llandaff Cathedral; and, from 1825, its Chancellor.

He died on 8 August 1845. His brother James Knight-Bruce was an English barrister, known as a judge and politician.

Works
Bruce Knight wrote:

Remarks Historical and Philological on the Welsh Language 
A Critical Review of John Jones' Reply

He was one of the editors of the 1841 revised version of the Welsh Book of Common Prayer.

References

People educated at Sherborne School
Alumni of Exeter College, Oxford
Deans of Llandaff
1786 births
1845 deaths